Roy Moore is an American judge and alleged rapist.

Roy Moore may also refer to:

Roy Moore (English footballer) (1923–1991), English former professional footballer
Roy Moore (Australian footballer) (1914–1973), player of Australian football from the 1930s and 1940s
Roy Moore (baseball) (1898–1951), 1920s Major League Baseball pitcher
Roy Moore (cyclist) (born 1932), Australian Olympic cyclist
Roy D. Moore (1921–2014), American college football head coach
Roy K. Moore (1914–2008), chief FBI investigator in the murders of Chaney, Goodman, and Schwerner
Roy Moore (wrestler), wrestling and judo coach
A. Roy Moore, screenwriter of Black Christmas

See also
Danny Roy Moore (1925–c. 2020), Louisiana state senator
Ray Moore (disambiguation)